Congregation Shaarey Zedek (/ʃaʔaˈʁeiː ˈtsedek/; transl. 'Gates of Righteousness', Hebrew: שַׁעֲרֵי צֶדֶק, romanized: Sha'arei tzedek) is a Conservative synagogue in the Detroit suburb of Southfield, Michigan.

History

The congregation was founded in 1861 when the more traditional Jews of Detroit withdrew from Temple Beth El.  Shaarey Zedek was a founding member of the Conservative United Synagogue of America in 1913.

The congregation worshiped in a building at the intersection of Congress and St. Antoine streets in Detroit from its founding until 1877 when, on the same site, it erected an elaborate Moorish Revival edifice with tall, twin towers topped with Onion domes. It was the first purpose-built synagogue in the Detroit area and the first of no fewer than five synagogue buildings that the congregation would build within the space of a century. In 1903, the members having moved to a more fashionable neighborhood northeast of downtown, the congregation erected a new structure topped with an octagonal dome at the intersection of Winder and Brush streets. In 1913, Shaarey Zedek again followed its increasingly prosperous congregants north and moved into a spacious, new, domed Neo-classical synagogue building at Willis and Brush street where it would remain until 1930, when it moved to rented quarters. In 1932, the congregation again followed the movement of the congregants to a more suburban location on the city's northwest side and completed yet another new building.  It was a Romanesque Revival sanctuary at 2900 West Chicago Boulevard at Lawton Street, designed by the noted architect Albert Kahn. The building is now the home of the Clinton Street Greater Bethlehem Temple Church.  The congregation moved to its present building on Bell Road in suburban Southfield in 1962.

The congregation's present building in Southfield was designed by Percival Goodman. Henry Stoltzman writes that it "embod(ies) Goodman's work at the peak of his career."  The San Francisco Examiner named the building one of the "top 10 breathtaking places of worship" in the United States.  Jamie Sperti, a writer on The Examiner website called the congregation's dramatic concrete building a "phenomenal example of 1960s futuristic architecture" in her survey of the United States' top 10 breathtaking places of worship published April 9, 2009. The New York Times architecture critic Philip Nobel described it as a "roadside attraction" that "parlays a skyscraping Ark and an erupting eternal flame into a concrete Sinai on the shoulder of Interstate 696".

Notable members

 William Davidson (1922–2009), businessman, CEO of Guardian Industries and owner of the Detroit Pistons
 Max M. Fisher, businessman, Republican party fundraiser
 David Hermelin
 Carl Levin, US Senator, brother of Sander
 Sander Levin, US House member, brother of Carl
 Alfred Taubman
 Judge Avern Cohn

References

External links
 Shaarey Zedek website

Buildings and structures in Oakland County, Michigan
Conservative synagogues in Michigan
Religious organizations established in 1861
1861 establishments in Michigan
Synagogues completed in 1962
Percival Goodman synagogues
Modernist architecture in Michigan